Nils Langhelle (28 September 1907 – 28 August 1967) was a Norwegian politician for the Labour Party and Minister of Labour 1945–1946, Norway's first Minister of Transport and Communications 1946-1951 and 1951–1952, Minister of Defense 1952–1954, Minister of Trade and Shipping 1954-1955 and President of the Storting from 7 May 1958 to 30 September 1965.

He was arrested on 29 January 1943 and imprisoned in Grini concentration camp from May to December 1943, then in Sachsenhausen concentration camp until the end of World War II.

References

1907 births
1967 deaths
Government ministers of Norway
Ministers of Trade and Shipping of Norway
Members of the Storting
Labour Party (Norway) politicians
Grini concentration camp survivors
Sachsenhausen concentration camp survivors
Ministers of Transport and Communications of Norway
Presidents of the Storting
Vice Presidents of the Storting
20th-century Norwegian politicians
Chairpersons of the Norwegian Nobel Committee
Defence ministers of Norway